Ethics & International Affairs is a quarterly peer-reviewed academic journal covering ethical aspects of international relations.  It was established in 1987 and is published by Cambridge University Press on behalf of Carnegie Council for Ethics in International Affairs. Topics covered in the journal range from global justice, democratization, and international law, to human rights and women's rights. The current editorial team are: Joel H. Rosenthal (editor in chief), John Tessitore (editor), Adam Read-Brown (managing editor), and  John Krzyzaniak (assistant editor), all at Carnegie Council.

Abstracting and indexing 
The journal is abstracted and indexed in American Bibliography of Slavic and East European Studies, CSA Worldwide Political Science Abstracts, International Bibliography of the Social Sciences, International Political Science Abstracts, Lancaster Index to Defence & International Security Literature, PAIS International in Print, Philosopher's Index, Social Sciences Index, and Periodica Islamica.

According to the Journal Citation Reports, the journal has a 2015 impact factor of 0.576, ranking it 36th out of 51 journals in the category "Ethics".

See also 
 List of ethics journals

References

External links 
 

International relations journals
Cambridge University Press academic journals
Ethics journals
Quarterly journals
English-language journals
Publications established in 1987